İsmətli (known as Konstantinovka until 1992) is a village and municipality in the Bilasuvar Rayon of Azerbaijan.  It has a population of 3,622.

Notes

References 

Populated places in Bilasuvar District